Ernst Stoll (4 June 1927 – 22 September 2017) was a Swiss sports shooter. He competed at the 1964 Summer Olympics and the 1968 Summer Olympics.

References

1927 births
2017 deaths
Swiss male sport shooters
Olympic shooters of Switzerland
Shooters at the 1964 Summer Olympics
Shooters at the 1968 Summer Olympics
Sportspeople from Zürich